The historic 1969 South Carolina Gamecocks football team represented the University of South Carolina as a member of the Atlantic Coast Conference (ACC) during the 1969 NCAA University Division football season. Led by fourth-year head coach Paul Dietzel, the Gamecocks compiled an overall record of 7–4 with a mark of 6–0 in conference play, winning the ACC title, which remains their only conference championship in program history. South Carolina was invited to the Peach Bowl, where they were defeated by West Virginia. The team played home games at Carolina Stadium in Columbia, South Carolina.

Schedule

Game summaries

Duke

Pre game
On Saturday September 20, 1969, South Carolina hosted Duke to open the 100th college football season. Coming into the game, The Gamecocks were two and a half touchdown favorites according to odds makers, both teams being favorites to win the ACC in pre season speculation. An area of concern for the Gamecocks however was the unproven offensive line.

1st half

A Suggs fumble at the USC 33 recovered by Mike Fitzpatrick, set up the game's first score with a Pugh 24-yard field goal giving Duke a 3-0 lead.   The Gamecocks had a 10-3 lead at the half thanks to a Rudy Holloman 60 yard rushing touchdown, and a 30-yard field goal from Billy DuPre. The SC defense held Duke star QB Leo Hart to just five completions in 12 attempts for 28 yards. Just after the start of the 2nd quarter, USC's Holloman scored on a 60 yard run, giving the Gamecocks a 10-3 lead that they would take into the break.

2nd half

Duke QB Hart's bounced back in the 2nd half passing led them to a 51 yard touchdown drive capped by a three yard pass to Marcell Courtillet to tie the game 10-10 with 8:32 remaining in the 3rd quarter. DuPre 37 yard field goal in the 4th quarter gave SC the lead back 13-10, but Duke's QB Hart responded with 79 yard, 8 play drive, capped off by an 18-yard touchdown pass to Wes Chesson. With just under 11 minutes to play, Dietzel gambled on 4th and two, Gamecock QB Tommy Suggs faked a handoff and ran a 48 yard touchdown, darting through the right tackle without a single Duke player touching him giving SC a 20-17 lead. Duke's kicker Pugh would tie it at 20-20 with a 43-yard field goal.

Final drive
With only one minute and twenty five seconds left, the Gamecocks completed a 12 play scoring drive, beginning at their own 25 yard line. Muir opened the drive with a 10 yard run, Muir then caught a Suggs pass for 16 more yards. Later in the drive, Fred Zeigler caught his 100th pass in his career, a 24-yard pass from Suggs. On first down from the 2, Muir ran it in giving the Gamecocks the 27-20 lead and sending the sold out crowd of 42,791 into a frenzy.

Post game
Holloman finished with 125 yards rushing, QB Suggs had 105 rushing yards, and went 10-16 passing for 107 yards.

Dietzel post game said "That fourth down play at midfield with better than 10 minutes to go in the game was the biggest gamble that I've ever taken" also adding "Possibly the most amazing thing about our defense was that we played almost the whole game with Pat Watson and three true sophomores in the Secondary. It's most unusual for a major college team to play a game with three true sophomores in the secondary. You can get beat quicker there than anywhere else."

References

South Carolina
South Carolina Gamecocks football seasons
Atlantic Coast Conference football champion seasons
South Carolina Gamecocks football